M. S. Abdul Khader (c. 1932 - 3 October 2009) was an Indian politician of the Dravida Munnetra Kazhagam (DMK) and later, Anna Dravida Munnetra Kazhagam. He served as mayor of Chennai and Member of Parliament.

Political career 

Khader was elected mayor in December 1959, when the DMK won a majority of seats in the Corporation of Chennai. In 1972, Khader was elected to the Rajya Sabha but resigned shortly afterwards to join the AIADMK.

Death 

Khader died on 3 October 2009 following a  brief illness.

References 

 

1932 births
2009 deaths
Mayors of Chennai